Caesarscreek Township is one of the twelve townships of Greene County, Ohio, United States.  As of the 2010 census the township population was 1,137.

Geography
Located in the southern part of the county, it borders the following townships:
New Jasper Township - north
Silvercreek Township - northeast
Jefferson Township - east
Liberty Township, Clinton County - southeast
Chester Township, Clinton County - southwest
Spring Valley Township - west
Xenia Township - northwest

No municipalities are located in Caesarscreek Township.

Name and history
Caesarcreek Township was established in 1803.

It is the only Caesarscreek Township statewide.

Government
The township is governed by a three-member board of trustees, who are elected in November of odd-numbered years to a four-year term beginning on the following January 1. Two are elected in the year after the presidential election and one is elected in the year before it. There is also an elected township fiscal officer, who serves a four-year term beginning on April 1 of the year after the election, which is held in November of the year before the presidential election. Vacancies in the fiscal officership or on the board of trustees are filled by the remaining trustees.

References

External links
County website

Townships in Greene County, Ohio
1803 establishments in Ohio
Townships in Ohio